Chantal Cavin (born 12 February 1978) is a retired Swiss Paralympic swimmer who competed in international elite events. She is a World champion in both long course and short course freestyle swimming, she has also competed at the Paralympic Games three times but narrowly missed out on winning any medals at the 2008 Summer Paralympics in the 50m and 100m freestyle. Cavin lost her sight at the age of fourteen when she had a concussion following a sporting accident.

References

1978 births
Living people
Sportspeople from Bern
Paralympic swimmers of Switzerland
Swiss female freestyle swimmers
Swimmers at the 2004 Summer Paralympics
Swimmers at the 2008 Summer Paralympics
Swimmers at the 2012 Summer Paralympics
Medalists at the World Para Swimming Championships
S11-classified Paralympic swimmers
21st-century Swiss women